Gurgen I (died 891) was a Georgian prince of the Bagratid dynasty of Tao-Klarjeti. He was a presiding prince of Iberia with the Byzantine title of curopalates from 881 until his death in a dynastic feud in 891.

The oldest son of Prince Adarnase I, Gurgen was baptized by the prominent monk Grigol Khandzteli. He inherited from his father the duchy of Upper Tao, including the residence of Kalmakhi. In the dynastic war which erupted among the Bagratids, Gurgen initially sided with Nasra, who had murdered his cousin David I, the curopalates of Iberia in 881. True to the policy of division and because of the minority of David’s son and legitimate heir Adarnase, the Byzantine court confirmed as curopalate, not Adarnase, but Gurgen. Eventually, Gurgen switched his side and joined Adarnase against Nasra who was defeated and put to death in 888. As a result of the division of Nasra’s inheritance, Gurgen might have added Shavsheti and Artaani to his possessions, for we hear from the 18th-century Georgian chronicler Vakhushti of Gurgen having moved his residence there.

In the meantime Adarnase, not being a curopalate and having the example of his Armenian cousins before him, assumed the title of king. The relations between Adarnase and Gurgen grew tense and degenerated into an open warfare. Gurgen was fatally wounded and captured at Mglinavi near Artaani by Adarnase and his ally Bagrat Mampali in 891. According to his will, Gurgen was buried at the monastery of Opiza restored by him.

Gurgen was probably married to a daughter of Smbat VIII Bagratuni (826–855), the sparapet of  Armenia. He left two sons behind – Adarnase and Ashot Kukhi – thus being a founder of the Bagratid "first house of Tao" which would become extinct with his grandson Gurgen II.

References

891 deaths
Grand dukes of Tao
Kings of Bagratid Iberia
9th-century monarchs in Asia
Year of birth unknown
Kouropalatai
Bagrationi dynasty of Tao